Düzqışlaq is a village in the municipality of Təzəkənd in the Shamkir Rayon of Azerbaijan.

References

Populated places in Shamkir District